Devara Makkalu is a 1970 Indian Kannada language drama film directed by Y. R. Swamy based on the novel Meena by Ma. Na. Murthy. It stars Rajkumar along with Jayanthi, Kalpana and Rajesh in other lead roles. The film stars a soundtrack from G. K. Venkatesh and is produced by Bharath Enterprises.

Cast 

 Rajkumar as Ranga
 Jayanthi as Gowri
 Kalpana as Kanaka
 Rajesh as Babu
 Narasimharaju 
 Indira Devi
 Sampath as Krishnaswamy, a doctor
 M. Jayashree as Rukmini, Krishnaswamy's wife
 M. P. Shankar
 Sriram

Soundtrack 
The music of the film was composed by G. K. Venkatesh and lyrics for the soundtrack written by Chi. Udaya Shankar.

Track list

See also
 Kannada films of 1970

References

External links 
 
 Meena by Ma. Na. Murthy

1970 films
1970s Kannada-language films
Indian black-and-white films
Indian drama films
Films scored by G. K. Venkatesh
Films directed by Y. R. Swamy